Qasam may refer to:
 Qasam (film), a Pakistani film
 Qasam, Yemen, a village

See also 
 Qassam (disambiguation)